Beatriz Cervantes Mandujano (born 2 September 1976) is a Mexican politician from the Institutional Revolutionary Party. From 2000 to 2003 she served as Deputy of the LVIII Legislature of the Mexican Congress representing the State of Mexico.

References

1976 births
Living people
Politicians from the State of Mexico
Mexican women in politics
Institutional Revolutionary Party politicians
Deputies of the LVIII Legislature of Mexico
Members of the Chamber of Deputies (Mexico) for the State of Mexico
Women members of the Chamber of Deputies (Mexico)